Aryan is a 2014 Indian Kannada-language sports drama film. Initially directed by Late D. Rajendra Babu, who died while filming half-way, the responsibility of directing the film went to Chi Guru Dutt. The film was produced by Dhruv Das under the banner Dreamweaver Entertainment and stars Shiva Rajkumar and Ramya.

The movie is based on the life of Aryan (acted by Shiva Rajkumar), who is an athletics coach. His protégé, a sprint queen (acted by Ramya) goes on win a major athletics event. Against this backdrop, there is a love story between the two.

The first look and music of the film are released on 9 June 2014.

Plot
Aryan (Shiva Rajkumar) is a champion Indian athlete that when an athletics coach his protégé, a sprint queen (Ramya) goes on win a major athletics event. They are in a relationship.

Before Ramya finds success as an athlete and before Aryan regains his credibility as a coach, they have to overcome obstacles: hostility, betrayal, jealousy and lust.

Cast
 Shiva Rajkumar as Aryan
 Ramya as Shwetha
 Sarath Babu
 Bullet Prakash
 Sumithra Devi
 Raghu Mukherjee as Surendra Patil
 Archana Gupta as Hamsa
 Sudeep as Narrator (voice)

Production
Coinciding with the birthday of Shivarajkumar's late father and Kannada cinema's most celebrated actor, Rajkumar, the filming began on 24 April 2013. While the filming was half-complete, director D. Rajendra Babu died following a heart attack. Subsequently, Chi Guru Dutt was signed in on to direct the film.

Majority of the filming has been done in Bengaluru. Sporting sequences and some other portions are shot in Singapore. The film has lavishly shot sports sequences and some beautiful dance numbers. Harsha, the well known choreographer and director is involved in the dance sequences of the film.

Actor turned director Chi Guru Dutt, son of stalwart writer of Kannada cinema Chi. Udaya Shankar took over the film after the death of D. Rajendra Babu. He started work as a dedication to the legendary Kannada director. According to him, he worked as an actor under Babu in four films. Guru Dutt admits that it is an honour and a duty to complete this film. In fact, Guru Dutt feels that the film should credit Rajendra Babu as the director of Aryan, and not him. The producer, Dhruv Das, has decided that the film will credit both names as the directors of the film.

Soundtrack 
The first look of the film and audio of the film was released on 9 June 2014 in a well-received ceremony. The film has received extensive coverage in Kannada media. Renowned music director, Jassie Gift has composed the music of this film. This is second film where Shivarajkumar and Jassie Gift have come together. The composition of the song "We Will Rock You" by the British rock band, Queen, was reused for the song "Bittu Bidu".

Popular Bollywood and South Indian singers such as  KK, Sunidhi Chauhan, Shreya Ghoshal, Ranjith and Hariharan lent their voices to Aryan's songs.

Shiva's brother, actor Puneeth Rajkumar is also a part of the film's soundtrack.

Ramya's last feature film
The film gains high-profile traction, because of the presence of former Member of Parliament Ramya as lead actress with century star Shivarajakumar. This is their first and possibly last such pairing.

Ramya had announced she was quitting the film industry. According to her, "it is a special film for me and I want to quit on a high." "Someday I may comeback as Shivanna's sister," she said.

On her role Ramya disclosed the heart of the film. "It was because of Geetha and Shivanna's support I was able to complete the film. When I lost my father there was hardly anyone to help me out. They stood by me and extended their support." "My early days as an athlete came to my memory and I did not need any rehearsals because I knew the track race very well," she said.

See also
 List of sports films

References

External links
 

2014 films
2010s Kannada-language films
Indian sports drama films
2010s sports drama films
Films shot in Thailand
Films shot in Singapore
Films set in Singapore
Running films
Films directed by D. Rajendra Babu
2014 drama films